North East 2 (not to be confused with North 2 East) was an English Rugby Union league was at the eighth tier of the domestic competition when it was founded in 1987 and was available to teams in North East England.  Promoted teams moved up to North East 1 while relegated teams dropped to Durham/Northumberland 1 and latterly North East 3.  The division was abolished at the end of the 1999–2000 season due to RFU restructuring with teams being transferred to regional leagues such as Yorkshire 1 or Durham/Northumberland 1.

Original teams
When league rugby began in 1987 this division contained the following teams:

Barnsley
Beverley
Novocastrians
Newcastle University
Old Hymerians
Pocklington 
Pontefract
Ryton
Selby
Stockton
York

North East 2 honours

North East 2 (1987–1993)

The original North East 2 was a tier 8 league with promotion up to North East 1 and relegation down to either Durham/Northumberland 1 or Yorkshire 1.

North East 2 (1993–1996)

The creation of National 5 North for the 1993–94 season meant that North East 2 dropped from being a tier 8 league to a tier 9 league for the years that National 5 North was active.

North East 2 (1996–2000)

The cancellation of National 5 North at the end of the 1995–96 season meant that North East 2 reverted to being a tier 8 league.  Additionally, the creation of North East 3 at tier 9 for the 1996–97, meant that relegated teams dropped to this new league.  At the end of the 1999–00 season a further restructure of the leagues saw North East 1, North East 2 and North East 3 cancelled, along with their counterparts North West 1, North West 2 and North West 3.

Number of league titles

Ashington (1)
Beverley (1)
Bramley (1)
Bridlington (1)
Darlington (1)
Darlington Mowden Park (1)
Doncaster (1)
Horden (1)
Novocastrians (1)
Pocklington (1)
West Park Bramhope (1)
Wheatley Hills (1)
York (1)

Notes

References

See also
 English rugby union system
 Rugby union in England

Defunct rugby union leagues in England
Sports leagues established in 1987
Sports leagues disestablished in 2000